John Geiger may refer to:
 John Geiger (rower) (1873–1956), American rower
 John Geiger (author), American-born Canadian author
 John H. Geiger (1926–2011), American architect and engineer